Simplifydigital was founded in 2007 by two ex-Sky senior sales and marketing executives, Charlie Ponsonby and Lawrence Bleach. It owns and operates the UK’s largest and fastest growing “triple play” (TV, broadband, home phone) comparison sales platform.  The platform is used by Simplifydigital’s own branded business and by a number of blue chip retail clients who want to offer broadband switching to their customers.  These include: Barclays, Dixons Carphone, Sainsbury, and Comparethemarket.com.

The platform enables brands to offer a unique customer proposition designed to make TV, broadband and home phone switching easier. Consumers can switch online, via a mobile device or speak to an expert for free receiving Ofcom accredited, impartial advice to find the best deal and a free Switching Support service to ensure a switch with minimum of fuss.

Simplifydigital is rapidly expanding into the wider home services market in the UK enabled by a technology led culture of rapid innovation.  It launched energy switching in late 2015 via a revolutionary new energy switching app called Voltz which is available on Android and iOS.  The app enables users who may not have time to go online to switch energy providers, to easily move between energy providers with a couple of taps on their mobile.  Simplifydigital will launch mobile phone comparison in 2016.

Simplifydigital started Simplify Digital Web Services (SDWS) in 2010, to offer sales and retention SaaS to global TV, broadband, home phone and mobile telco companies faced with increasing pressures to attract and retain customers.  SDWS works with TalkTalk, EE, Webhelp and others to provide software “plug-ins” to legacy CRM systems, to help contact centre agents sell and retain customers. 

Simplifydigital has received wide recognition for its rapid growth and has been named in the Sunday Times Tech Track 100 and Deloitte Fast 50 in 2013, 2014 and 2015; the GP Bullhound Media Momentum Awards in 2013; the Red Herring Top 100 Europe and Global Top 100 in 2014; and named in the list of 1000 Companies to Inspire Britain in 2015.

In 2016, Simplifydigital was acquired by Dixons Carphone.

References

Online marketplaces of the United Kingdom
Comparison shopping websites